The Sherman-Williamsville Trail is a  right-of-way that has been set aside for future use as a rail trail from Sherman, Illinois to Williamsville, Illinois in Fancy Creek Township and Williams Township in northern Sangamon County.

The southwest end of the trail in Sherman will be along East Andrew Road between Bahr Road and Pine Drive.  The northeast end of the trail in Williamsville will be on Conrey Street east of Elm Street.

The right-of-way occupies part of what was once an electric interurban line operated by the Illinois Terminal Railroad (ITR) from 1906 until 1956.  The right-of-way, which generally parallels Interstate 55, has passed into the hands of the electrical utility holding company Ameren, the current owner, and is used as a high-tension power corridor.

Construction and operation of the proposed rail trail will be carried out by the village of Williamsville.

Current events
On 6 December 2010, the Sherman-Williamsville rail-trail project received a $269,000 state/federal grant for engineering planning purposes.  The money will be used to survey the route and do test borings to determine if the ITR's railroad ballast remains in place underneath the land surface of the overgrown right-of-way.

As of 2011, the Sherman and Williamsville municipalities are among the fastest-growing areas in Central Illinois by population.  The total cost of the Sherman-Williamsville trail project was estimated in December 2010 at $2.38 million.

On 27 May 2011, Williamsville announced that engineering and design work, to be carried out under the December 2010 grant, would start in summer 2011.  

In 2016 The project was awarded $2,000,000 for construction

References

Rail trails in Illinois
Geography of Sangamon County, Illinois
Protected areas of Sangamon County, Illinois